Inti Utka (Aymara willka, inti sun, utka seat, a place to sit down, "sun seat", Hispanicized spelling Intiutca) is a mountain in the Wansu mountain range in the Andes of Peru, about  high. It is situated in the Apurímac Region, Antabamba Province, Antabamba District, and in the Arequipa Region, La Unión Province, Huaynacotas District. Inti Utka lies between the mountains Arapa in the northwest and Uchusu Q'asa (Uchusojasa) in the east.

See also 
 Quri Waraqa

References 

Mountains of Peru
Mountains of Apurímac Region
Mountains of Arequipa Region